Jeffery Robinson (born December 16, 1991), better known by his stage name J. Oliver and also known as Fresh Ayr is an artist, producer, musician, songwriter, singer and rapper from Baltimore, Maryland.

Life and career 
J.Oliver was born and raised in Baltimore, Maryland, where he graduated from Cardinal Gibbons High School and earned a  bachelor's degree from Morgan State University.

J.Oliver has the creativity and understanding of different genres to be able to produce all genre of music. He has produced music for Trey songz, Kevin Hart,  Meek Mill, Kirko Bangz, French Montana, Trae Tha Truth, & Young Thug. He produced Kevin Harts & Trey songz "Push it on me", Meek Mill's “Fck You Mean” & "Cream", “Old Ways” by Kirko Bangz, French Montana's “I Told ‘Em,” and Young Thug "Like". Not limited to only rap music, J.Oliver's versatile production style has been courted by the likes of R&B songstress Tinashe, crooner Raheem DeVaughn, and all-male group Day 26, started by music mogul Sean Combs.

J.Oliver also expanded his resume to include songwriting, a gift he has shared with major labels such as Universal, Atlantic Records, Universal Motown Records, RCA Records, Epic Records as well Interscope Records artists.

Besides being able to produce records, J.Oliver is also an artist and performer. He has shared the stage with high-profile artists including Nelly, 2-Chainz, Big Sean, Yo Gotti, Waka Flocka, Mack Wilds, Trae Tha Truth, Chris Brown, as well as Rae Sremmurd.

Producer discography

External links
http://www.baltimoresun.com/entertainment/bthesite/tv-lust/bs-b-baltimore-producers-j-oliver-photo.html
http://www.thefader.com/2015/09/03/j-oliver-mommas-house-i-am-kanye-west
http://www.hotnewhiphop.com/j-oliver-i-am-kanye-west-new-mixtape.116018.html
http://bmoresveryown.blogspot.com/2013/03/king-los-becoming-king-intro-preview.html
http://www.citypaper.com/bob/bcp-arts-entertainment-2013,0,5707410.story
http://www.dallasobserver.com/music/j-oliver-wants-luke-bryan-to-help-him-become-the-next-kanye-west-really-7681845

1991 births
Living people
Musicians from Baltimore
American male rappers
American male singer-songwriters
21st-century American rappers
21st-century American male musicians
Singer-songwriters from Maryland